Peter John Nickles (born September 26, 1938) is an American attorney who served as Attorney General of the District of Columbia from 2008 to 2011. He was previously General Counsel to Mayor Adrian Fenty from the time he took office in January 2007 and a litigator at Covington & Burling from 1963 to 2006. He left office in 2011 to return to Covington.

References

1938 births
Living people
American lawyers
District of Columbia Attorneys General
Harvard Law School alumni
Princeton University alumni